The Haidian Mosque is a mosque in Haidian District, Beijing, China.

History
The mosque was originally constructed during the late Ming dynasty. During the reign of the Jiaqing Emperor of the Qing dynasty, the mosque was renovated and expanded to its current state.

Architecture
The mosque has a capacity of 200 worshipers.

Transportation
The mosque is accessible within walking distance west of Haidian Huangzhuang Station of Beijing Subway.

See also
 Islam in China
 List of mosques in China

References

Buildings and structures in Haidian District
Mosques in Beijing